Elections were held in the organized municipalities in the Rainy River District of Ontario on October 24, 2022 in conjunction with municipal elections across the province.

Alberton
The following were the results for reeve of Alberton.

Atikokan
The following were the results for mayor of Atikokan.

Chapple
James Franklin Gibson was acclaimed as reeve of Chapple.

Dawson
Douglas Hartnell was acclaimed as mayor of Dawson.

Emo
Harold McQuaker was acclaimed as mayor of Emo.

Fort Frances
The following were the results for mayor of Fort Frances.

Lake of the Woods
Colleen Fadden was acclaimed as mayor of Lake of the Woods.

La Vallee
The following were the results for reeve of La Vallee.

Morley
George Heyens was acclaimed as reeve of Morley.

Rainy River
Deborah J. Ewald was acclaimed as mayor of Rainy River.

References 

Rainy River
Rainy River District